Tang Lin (born 7 May 1976) is a Chinese judoka and Olympic champion. She won a gold medal in the half heavyweight division at the 2000 Summer Olympics in Sydney.

References

External links
 
 
 

1976 births
Living people
Olympic judoka of China
Judoka at the 2000 Summer Olympics
Olympic gold medalists for China
Olympic medalists in judo
Sportspeople from Sichuan
People from Neijiang
Asian Games medalists in judo
Judoka at the 1998 Asian Games
Chinese female judoka
Asian Games gold medalists for China
Medalists at the 1998 Asian Games
Medalists at the 2000 Summer Olympics
20th-century Chinese women
21st-century Chinese women